Joseph Adam Miller III (born June 28, 1969) is an American educator and politician currently serving as the State Representative for the 53rd district of the Ohio House of Representatives. He is a member of the Democratic Party. His district consists of portions of Lorain County. He is a former City Council Member for the city of Amherst, Ohio.

Political career

Election
Miller was elected in the general election on November 6, 2018, winning 63 percent of the vote over 37 percent of Republican candidate Rob Weber.

Committees
Miller is a member of the following committees: Higher Education, Primary and Secondary Education, and Federalism.

Election history

References

Miller, Joe
Living people
21st-century American politicians
1969 births
Bowling Green State University alumni
Ashland University alumni